Paper wasps are vespid wasps that gather fibers from dead wood and plant stems, which they mix with saliva, and use to construct nests made of gray or brown papery material. Some types of paper wasps are also sometimes called umbrella wasps, due to the distinctive design of their nests.

Species 
The name "paper wasps" typically refers to members of the vespid subfamily Polistinae, though it often colloquially includes members of the subfamilies Vespinae (hornets and yellowjackets) and Stenogastrinae, which also make nests out of paper. Twenty-two species of Polistes paper wasps have been identified in North America and approximately 300 species have been identified worldwide. The most common paper wasp in Europe is Polistes dominula. The Old World tribe Ropalidiini contains another 300 species, and the Neotropical tribes Epiponini and Mischocyttarini each contain over 250 more, so the total number of true paper wasps worldwide is about 1100 species, almost half of which can be found in the neotropics.

Nests 

The nests of most true paper wasps are characterized by having open combs with cells for brood rearing, and a 'petiole', or constricted stalk, that attaches the nest to a branch or other structure. Paper wasps secrete a chemical which repels ants, which they spread around the base of the anchor to prevent the loss of eggs or brood. 

Most social wasps of the family Vespidae make nests from paper, but some stenogastrine species, such as Liostenogaster flavolineata, use mud. A small group of eusocial crabronid wasps, of the genus Microstigmus (the only eusocial wasps outside the family Vespidae), also constructs nests out of chewed plant fibers, though the nest consistency is quite different from those of true paper wasps, due to the absence of wood fibers, and the use of silk extruded by female wasps to bind the fibers.

Nests can be found in sheltered areas, such as the eaves of a house, the branches of a tree, on the end of an open pipe, or on an old clothesline. Some species, such as Ropalidia romandi, will vary their nest architecture depending on where they build their nest.

Three species of Polistes are obligate social parasites, and have lost the ability to build their own nests, and are sometimes referred to as "cuckoo paper wasps". They rely on the nests of their hosts to raise their brood. A few hornets and yellowjackets are also brood parasites (e.g., Vespula austriaca).

Behavior 

Unlike yellowjackets and hornets, which can be very aggressive, polistine paper wasps will generally only attack if they themselves or their nest are threatened. Their territoriality can lead to attacks on people, and their stings are quite painful and – like all venomous animals – can produce a potentially fatal anaphylactic reaction in some individuals. A study conducted on European paper wasps (Polistes dominula) concluded that wasps with brighter aposematic colors are more venomous, because they have larger venom glands, and offer a stronger warning signal to organisms threatening the nest.

Most wasps are beneficial in their natural habitat, and are critically important in natural biocontrol. Paper wasps feed on nectar and other insects, including caterpillars, flies, and beetle larvae. Because they are a known pollinator and feed on known garden pests, paper wasps are often considered to be beneficial by gardeners.

See also 
 Biological pest control
 Schmidt sting pain index
 Polistes
 Polistinae
 Ropalidiini

References

External links 
  National Geographic News: Wasps Can Recognize Faces. Retrieved 2012-12-04.

Biological pest control wasps
Vespidae
Articles containing video clips
Insect common names